Heliacus is a genus of gastropods belonging to the family Architectonicidae.

The genus has cosmopolitan distribution.

Species:

Heliacus anaglyptus 
Heliacus areola 
Heliacus asteleformis 
Heliacus bisulcatus 
Heliacus caelatus 
Heliacus cerdaleus 
Heliacus corallinus 
Heliacus costatus 
Heliacus cylindricus 
Heliacus darraghi 
Heliacus discoideus 
Heliacus enoshimensis 
Heliacus fallaciosus 
Heliacus fenestratus 
Heliacus geminus 
Heliacus hyperionis 
Heliacus imperfectus 
Heliacus implexus 
Heliacus infundibuliformis 
Heliacus jeffreysianus 
Heliacus madurensis 
Heliacus malani 
Heliacus mazatlanicus 
Heliacus mighelsi 
Heliacus miser 
Heliacus nereidis 
Heliacus oceanitis 
Heliacus otwayanus 
Heliacus planispira 
Heliacus ponderi 
Heliacus proteus 
Heliacus reticulatus 
Heliacus rotula 
Heliacus sterkii 
Heliacus stramineus 
Heliacus taverai 
Heliacus trochoides 
Heliacus turritus 
Heliacus variegatus 
Heliacus verdensis 
Heliacus virgatus 
Heliacus willianseverii 
Heliacus worsfoldi

References

Gastropods